José Esteban de Palma (born January 18, 1967) is a former volleyball player from Argentina, who represented his native country at the 1988 Summer Olympics in Seoul. There he won the bronze medal with the men's national team, after also having competed at the 1984 Summer Olympics in Los Angeles.

References
Profile

1967 births
Argentine men's volleyball players
Living people
Olympic volleyball players of Argentina
Volleyball players at the 1984 Summer Olympics
Volleyball players at the 1988 Summer Olympics
Olympic bronze medalists for Argentina
Place of birth missing (living people)
Olympic medalists in volleyball
Medalists at the 1988 Summer Olympics